The BBC Asian Network, a BBC National Radio station, had a number of programmes in South Asian languages aimed at a specific community, although since 24 April 2005 under schedule changes as part of a broader review of BBC programming the BBC Asian Network has shifted towards a greater emphasis on English language programming.

Hindi and Urdu Programming
Gagan Grewal consisting of News, Views, Discussions & Celebrity Interviews presented by Gagan Grewal in Hindi and Urdu - the programme first aired on 15 May 2006 originally under the name Salaam Namaste.
Hindi-Urdu Programme presented by Sanjay Sharma on Thursday Evenings.

Punjabi
Punjabi Programme presented by Neelu Kalsi on Friday Evenings.
Weekend Punjabi Sukhi Bart presents Punjabi Language Programming on from 17:00 - 19:00 on Sunday (previously on Saturday Evenings).

Gujarati
Gujarati Programme presented by Dev Parmar on Wednesday Evenings from 20:00 - 22:00.
 Weekend Gujarati Dev Parmar presents Gujarati Language Programming  on from 21:00 - 23:00 on Sunday (previously on Saturday Evenings).

Mirpuri
Mirpuri Programme presented by Zarina Khan on Monday Evenings.
Weekend Mirpuri, Changis Raja presents Mirpuri Language Programming on from 21:00 to 23:00 every Sunday (prior to 17 June the programme had been an hour earlier).

Bengali
Weekend Bengali, Anwarul Hoque presents Bengali Language Programming from 23:00 on Sunday to 01:00 on Monday mornings (prior to 17 June the programme had been an hour earlier).

Regional Language Programmes scrapped or to be scrapped
From 24 April 2004 the Afternoon programme (primarily in Hindi and Urdu presented from 14:00 to 16:00 on weekdays by Navinder Bhogal was scrapped (she actually finished on it on 8 April 2006).

External links
BBC Asian Network
Gagan Grewal (last on: 29 December 2016)
Mirpuri Programme (weekday) (last on: 15 October 2012)
Weekend Mirpuri (last on: 25 November 2012)
Bengali Programme (weekday) (last on: 16 October 2012)
Weekend Bengali (last on: 25 November 2012)
Gujarati Programme (weekday) (last on: 17 October 2012)
Weekend Gujarati (last on: 25 November 2012)
Hindi-Urdu Programme (last on: 18 October 2012)
Punjabi Programme (weekday) (last on: 19 October 2012)
Weekend Punjabi (last on: 25 November 2012)

BBC Asian Network programmes